The Dominican Summer League Astros,  or DSL Astros, is a minor league baseball team of the Dominican Summer League, and a Rookie-level affiliate of the Houston Astros. They are located in Boca Chica, Santo Domingo, Dominican Republic.  From 2014 through 2017, they were divided into two squads: DSL Astros Orange and DSL Astros Blue.

History
The team first came into existence in 1989 when they shared an affiliation with the Chicago White Sox and the Texas Rangers.  For 1990, they shared an affiliation with the St. Louis Cardinals.  They were independently affiliated for 1991 and 1992, then gained an affiliation with the San Francisco Giants and Philadelphia Phillies for 1993.  From 1994 to 1995, they shared an affiliation with the Milwaukee Brewers.  For 1996, they shared an affiliation with the Boston Red Sox.  Since 1997, they have been an independent affiliate of the Astros.  Beginning in 2014, the team split into two squads, DSL Astros Orange and DSL Astros Blue.

Roster

References
"Houston Astros Minor League Affiliations." Baseball-Reference. Retrieved on 10 September 2010.

External links
Dominican Summer Astros page at MiLB.com

Baseball teams established in 1997
Baseball teams in the Dominican Republic
Dominican Summer League teams
Houston Astros minor league affiliates